McGregor House may refer to the following places:
McGregor House (Tulsa, Oklahoma), listed on the National Register of Historic Places
McGregor House (Aberdeen, South Dakota), listed on the National Register of Historic Places